Protein Z-dependent protease inhibitor (ZPI) is a protein circulating in the blood which inhibits factors Xa and XIa of the coagulation cascade. It is a member of the class of the serine protease inhibitors (serpins). Its name implies that it requires protein Z, another circulating protein, to function properly, but this only applies to its inhibition of factor X.

It is about 72 kDa heavy and 444 amino acids large. It is produced by the liver.

Role in disease
Water et al. found deficiency of ZPI in 4.4% of a cohort of patients with thrombophilia (a tendency to thrombosis).

History
Han et al. first described ZPI in 1998. The same group further characterised it in 2000.

References

External links
 The MEROPS online database for peptidases and their inhibitors: I04.005

Coagulation system
Serine protease inhibitors